Fabrizio Cacciatore (born 8 October 1986) is an Italian professional footballer who plays as a full back.

Club career

Sampdoria
Born in Turin, Piedmont, Cacciatore started his career at Pro Vercelli, in Vercelli, Piedmont. In 2003, he joined Sampdoria as a youth player. After spending four seasons on loan at lower division clubs, he would finally feature in his first match for Sampdoria on 16 August 2009, in a 6–2 loss to Lecce in the Coppa Italia. For that season he wore the number 22 shirt.

On 31 January 2011, Cacciatore was signed by Siena. On 8 July 2011, Cacciatore joined Varese.

Verona
On 31 August 2012, he signed for Verona on a temporary deal. On 19 June 2013, Verona signed him in a co-ownership deal for €500,000.

Return to Sampdoria
On 20 June 2014, Sampdoria bought back Cacciatore for €370,000; he signed a three-year contract. He was injured in January 2015 in the match against Internazionale in the 2014–15 Coppa Italia competition. Although he returned to training in March, he still missed the rest of the season. Cacciatore was not included in the party for the July 2015 pre-season training camp.

Chievo
On 16 July 2015, Cacciatore joined Chievo on a year's loan, with an obligation to buy, as part of the deal to send Ervin Zukanović to Sampdoria. He was given squad number 29.

Cagliari
On 31 January 2019, Cacciatore joined to Cagliari on loan with an obligation to buy.

Ascoli
On 28 March 2021, he signed with Ascoli in Serie B.

International career

He was twice called up to the Italy U18 squad.

References

External links
Profile at Sampdoria 
Profile at FIGC  
 Lega Serie A profile 

Living people
1986 births
Footballers from Turin
Association football defenders
Italian footballers
Italy youth international footballers
F.C. Pro Vercelli 1892 players
U.C. Sampdoria players
A.C. Reggiana 1919 players
U.S. Triestina Calcio 1918 players
S.S.D. Varese Calcio players
A.C.N. Siena 1904 players
A.S.D. Città di Foligno 1928 players
Hellas Verona F.C. players
A.C. ChievoVerona players
Cagliari Calcio players
Ascoli Calcio 1898 F.C. players
Serie A players
Serie B players
Serie C players